Ali bin Hussein  (18791935), was King of Hejaz and Grand Sharif of Mecca from October 1924 until he was deposed by Abdulaziz bin Abdulrahman Al Saud in December 1925. He was the eldest son of King Hussein bin Ali and a scion of the Hashemite family. With the passing of the kingship from his father he also became the heir to the title of caliph, but he did not adopt the office and the style of caliph.

Early life
The eldest son of Hussein, Ali bin Hussein was born in Mecca and was educated at Ghalata Serai College (Galatasaray High School) in İstanbul (Constantinople). His father was appointed Grand Sharif of Mecca by the Ottoman Empire in 1908. However, his relationship with the Young Turks in control of the Empire increasingly became strained, and, in 1916, he became one of the leaders of the Arab Revolt against Turkish rule. Following the Revolt's success, Hussein made himself the first King of Hejaz with British support. While Hussein's sons Abdullah and Faisal were made kings of Jordan and Iraq, respectively, Ali remained the heir to his father's lands in Arabia.

Ruling Hejaz
King Hussein soon found himself embroiled in fighting with the House of Saud, based in Riyadh. Following military defeats by Abdulaziz ibn Saud, King Hussein abdicated all of his secular titles to Ali on 3 October 1924. (Hussein had previously awarded himself the religious title of Caliph in March of that year.)

In December of the following year, Saudi forces finally overran the Hashemite Kingdom of Hejaz, which they eventually incorporated into the Kingdom of Saudi Arabia. Ali and his family fled to Iraq.

Ali bin Hussein died in Baghdad in the Hashemite Kingdom of Iraq in 1935. He had four daughters and one son, 'Abd al-Ilah, who went on to become the regent of the Kingdom of Iraq during the minority of King Faisal II.

Marriage and children
In 1906 Ali married Nafissa Khanum, daughter of Emir Abdullah bin Muhammad Pasha, Grand Sharif and Emir of Mecca at Yeniköy, Bosphorus. They had one son and four daughters:
Princess Khadija Abdiya – born 1907 – died 14 July 1958.
Princess Aliya – born 1911 – died 21 December 1950, married her first cousin, Ghazi I King of Iraq, becoming Queen Aliya of Iraq.
Crown Prince Abd al-Ilah – born 14 November 1913 – died 14 July 1958, married three times first to Melek el-Din Fauzi in 1936 divorced in 1940, then to Faiza al-Tarabulsi in 1948 divorced 1950 and finally to Hiyam 'Abdu'l-Ilah in 1958.
Princess Badiya – born June 1920 - died London 9 May 2020, married Sharif Al-Hussein bin Ali. They had a son, Sharif Ali bin Al-Hussein and 2 daughters.
Princess Jalila – born 1923 – died 28 December 1955, married Sharif Dr. Ahmad Hazim Bey.

Ancestry

References

External links 
Information on King Ali's genealogy
Family tree of the Hashemites
Web archive

Arabs from the Ottoman Empire
Kings of Hejaz
Muslim monarchs
1879 births
1935 deaths
Honorary Knights Grand Cross of the Order of the British Empire
Sharifs of Mecca
People from Jeddah
Grand Cordons of the Order of Independence (Jordan)
Dhawu Awn
19th-century Arabs
20th-century Arabs
People of the Arab Revolt
Arab slave owners